Wo Keng Shan is a village in Ta Kwu Ling, North District, Hong Kong.

Administration
Wo Keng Shan is a recognized village under the New Territories Small House Policy.

See also
 List of planning areas in Hong Kong

References

External links
 Delineation of area of existing village Wo Keng Shan (Ta Kwu Ling) for election of resident representative (2019 to 2022)

Villages in North District, Hong Kong